Diestoceratidae is a family in the nautiloid cephalopod order Oncocerida with compressed, straight to faintly endogastic breviconic shells with a marginal siphuncle that contains discrete, irregular actinosphonate deposits.

The Diestoceratidae contains five known genera. They are:
Diestoceras
Danoceras
Dowlingoceras
Lyckholmoceras
Suttonoceras

References

External links
Diestoceratidae -Paleobio db
 Sweet, Walter C. 1964. Nautiloidea -Oncocera. Treatise on Invertebrate Paleontology, Part K. Geological Soc. of America & Univ Kansas Press.

Oncocerida
Prehistoric nautiloid families